Onion Johnnies ( or ) were Breton farmers and agricultural labourers who travelled on bicycles selling distinctive pink onions door to door in Great Britain, and especially in Wales where they share linguistic similarities.

They have adapted this nickname for themselves in Breton as ar Johniged or ar Johnniged.

Declining since the 1950s to only a few, the Onion Johnny was once very common. With renewed interest since the late 1990s by farmers and the public in small-scale agriculture, their numbers have recently made a small recovery. Dressed in striped Breton shirt and beret, riding a bicycle hung with onions, the Onion Johnny became the stereotypical image of the Frenchman in the United Kingdom and was possibly in many cases the only contact that ordinary British people had with France and French people.

History

The trade may have begun in 1828 when the first successful trip is said to have been made by Henri Ollivier. From the area around Roscoff in Brittany known as Bro Rosko, Johnnies found a more profitable market in Britain than in France, and typically brought their harvest across the English Channel in July to store in rented barns, returning home in December or January. They could have sold their produce in Paris, but the roads and the railways were bad in the 19th century and going there was a long and difficult trip; crossing the Channel was shorter and easier. 

As the early Johnnies were all Breton-speakers, Wales was a favoured destination. Breton is a Brythonic language related to Welsh and Cornish, and the Johnnies would have found Welsh a far easier language to learn than English.

The golden age for Johnnies across the UK was during the 1920s; in 1929 nearly 1,400 Johnnies imported over 9,000 tonnes of onions to the UK. The Great Depression, followed by the devaluation of the Pound in the early 1930s, ended the era as trade suddenly fell, reaching a low in 1934, when fewer than 400 people imported under 3,000 tonnes.

In the aftermath of World War II, onions in common with other goods were subject to import restrictions, and were obliged to be traded through a single company.  By 1973 the number of Johnnies had dropped to 160, trading 1,100 tonnes, and had fallen again to around 20 by the end of the 20th century.

Journeys are now made by ferry but small sailing ships and steamers were used previously, and the crossing could be hazardous. Seventy Johnnies died when the steamer SS Hilda sank at Saint-Malo in 1905.

In culture
The Onion Johnny museum opened in Roscoff in 2004, with a two-day Fête de l'Oignon (Onion Festival) held every summer.  Since 2009 the  has been protected under the French Appellation d'Origine Contrôlée designation.

References

Further reading
 Herrick Corre, Trubuillou eur Johnny war e vloavez kenta in le Courrier du Finistère 1929.

BBC short film (RealVideo)

External links 
The Johnnies of Roscoff and its region (PDF) in French, Breton and English
 Onion Johnnie museum in Roscoff

Agricultural occupations (plant)
French cuisine
History of the British Isles
Onions
France–United Kingdom relations
History of Brittany
Agriculture in France
Economic history of Wales